Pumpkintown may refer to:

Pumpkintown, South Carolina, an unincorporated community in Pickens County
Pumpkintown, West Virginia, an unincorporated community in Randolph County